Anne Parker may refer to:

 Anne Parker (actress), British stage actress
Anne McHardy Parker, mutineer's wife
Anne Parker, character in Decoding Annie Parker

See also
Ann Parker (disambiguation)